Pteromicra angustipennis is a species of fly in the family Sciomyzidae. It is found in the  Palearctic. The larvae predators of terrestrial snails or stranded freshwater pulmonate snails.

References

External links
Images representing Pteromicra angustipennis  at BOLD

Sciomyzidae
Insects described in 1845
Taxa named by Rasmus Carl Stæger
Diptera of Europe